Max Joseph Fiske  (September 27, 1913March 15, 1973) was an American football player for the Pittsburgh Pirates, now the Pittsburgh Steelers.

In 1977, he was inducted into the Roseland Pullman Sports Hall of Fame.

References

1913 births
1973 deaths
Players of American football from Chicago
American football quarterbacks
DePaul Blue Demons football players
Pittsburgh Pirates (football) players
Year of death unknown